The Knocklofty Formation is an Early Triassic geologic formation from southern Tasmania, Australia, belonging to the Induan stage. It is made of Sandstone.

List of known fossil taxa

Tetrapods 

 Banksiops townrowi
 Chomatobatrachus halei
 Deltasaurus kimberleyensis
 Derwentia warreni
 Rotaurisaurus contundo
 Tasmaniosaurus triassicus
 Watsonisuchus sp.

Fish 

 Ceratodus sp.
 Saurichthys sp.
 Cleithrolepis sp.

References 

Induan Stage
Paleontology in Australia
Paleontology in Tasmania